This is a list of presidents of the Senate of the Netherlands.

List of presidents of the Senate since 1929

See also 
 List of speakers of the House of Representatives (Netherlands)

Sources 
   
  President of the Senate at Parlement.com

Lists of political office-holders in the Netherlands
Netherlands